Gigyani is a tribe of Pakhtuns.

Pashtun tribes
Social groups of Pakistan